Discovery Park is a  multidisciplinary research park located in Purdue University's West Lafayette campus in the U.S. state of Indiana. Tomás Díaz de la Rubia, an energy and resources industry executive who also spent a decade as a top scientist and administrator at Lawrence Livermore National Laboratory, serves as Discovery Park's Vice President.

Discovery Park was established in 2001 with donations from the Lilly Endowment and from the state of Indiana, and its first buildings opened in 2004. By 2014,  Discovery Park had surpassed a $1 billion milestone in research investments and impact, with six research and office buildings.

Centers

Cross-Cutting Centers 
 Bindley Bioscience Center
 Birck Nanotechnology Center
 Burton D. Morgan Center for Entrepreneurship
 Network for Computational Nanotechnology
 Purdue Center for the Science of Information
 Purdue Policy Research Institute
 Purdue Quantum Science and Engineering Institute

Centers for Global Health 
 Purdue Institute of Inflammation, Immunology and Infectious Disease
 Purdue Institute for Integrative Neuroscience
 Purdue Institute for Drug Discovery
 Regenstrief Center for Healthcare Engineering

Centers for Global Sustainability 
 Center for Global Food Security
 Center for the Environment
 Purdue Climate Change Research Center

Centers for Global Security 
 Institute for Global Security and Defense Innovation
 Naval Enterprise Partnership Teaming with Universities for National Excellence (NEPTUNE)
 Center for Education and Research in Information Assurance and Security (CERIAS)

Affiliated Project Centers and Institutes

Cross-cutting Centers and Institutes  
 Integrative Data Science Initiative
 Center for Analytical Instrument Development
 Research Center for Open Digital Innovation
 Purdue Center for Predictive Material and Devices (c-PRIMED)
 CAPSL
 NEWLIMITS

Global Health 
 Women's Global Health Institute

Global Sustainability 
 Center for Innovative and Strategic Transformation of Alkane Resources (CISTAR)
 Joint Transportation Research Program (JTRP)
 Natural Hazards Engineering Research Infrastructure (NHERI-NCO)
 Purdue Center for Global Soundscapes

Global Security 
 High Tech Crime Unit (HTCU)
 Visual Analytics for Command, Control, and Interoperability Environments Center (VACCINE)

Facilities

Bindley Bioscience Center
The Bindley Bioscience Center (BBC) is a multidisciplinary research facility where life sciences and engineering researchers collaborate to explore new technologies and scientific knowledge that impact the broad boundaries of plant, animal and human diseases. Laboratory space and high-end scientific equipment are shared and available to support diverse projects, ranging from complex diseases to technology development to new catalysts for biofuels production. An expert staff provides research consultation and technical support to enable technology implementation, feasibility studies and the generation of pilot data to support new project ideas. In 2012, the building was expanded by 29,000 square feet with the addition of the Multidisciplinary Cancer Research Facility, designed for work on innovative animal models of disease, development of new therapeutics, and in-vivo animal imaging.

Birck Nanotechnology Center
The Birck Nanotechnology Center leverages advances in nanoscale science and engineering to create innovative nanotechnologies addressing societal challenges and opportunities in computing, communications, the environment, security, energy independence, and health. In turn, the BNC exploits the accelerating progress in nanotechnology utilizing the most advanced nanoscale instrumentation to pursue answers to fundamental questions in the life and physical sciences. The building is an  research facility consisting of a  nanofabrication ISO class 3 cleanroom, including a biocleanroom, heavy laboratory space, and office areas. One of the most advanced facilities of its kind in the world, it is designed to support multidisciplinary research in nanotechnology and to foster interaction between researchers and research disciplines.

Gerald D. and Edna E. Mann Hall
The Gerald D. and Edna E. Mann Hall is home to the Regenstrief Center for Healthcare Engineering, the Center for Regional Development, the Purdue Homeland Security Institute, the U.S.-China Ecopartnership for Environmental Sustainability and the Center for Global Soundscapes. The facility also houses several sustainability programs, including Purdue's Energy Center, Center for the Environment, Purdue Water Community, Center for Global Food Security and the Purdue Climate Change Research Center. Sustainability researchers specializes in biofuels, solar, wind, clean coal, nuclear, batteries, water and hydrogen, as well as biodiversity, climate change, the carbon cycle, hydroclimatology, weather extremes and food security issues.

Burton D. Morgan Center for Entrepreneurship
Purdue University's innovation, entrepreneurship, commercialization and partnership programs are co-located in the Burton D. Morgan building in Discovery Park in an effort to streamline access to these programs. The Burton D. Morgan Center for Entrepreneurship programs are housed in the facility along with the Office for Corporate and Global Partnerships. In 2013, the Purdue Research Foundation launched The Purdue Foundry, a commercialization hub designed to enhance the University's robust entrepreneurial ecosystem involving every Purdue college, school and department. The Office of Technology Commercialization also staffs an office in the building. Burton Morgan also provides space for the Certificate for Entrepreneurship and Innovation Program, and the Small Business Development Office.

Hall for Discovery and Learning Research
This building houses the Discovery Learning Research Center (DLRC), which focuses on science and engineering learning research. Experts in academia, industry and K-12 education converge to perform educational research and innovation to revolutionize learning in STEM fields — science, technology, engineering and math. The DLRC organizes and studies undergraduate student research internships. The building also houses the Center for Predictive Materials and Devices (c-PRIMED), the Network for Computational Nanotechnology (NCN), and IMPACT, which is Purdue's academic course transformation project.

See also
 Purdue Research Park

References

External links
Discovery Park Home Page

Science parks in the United States
Purdue University
West Lafayette, Indiana
2001 establishments in Indiana
Economy of Indiana